Margaret Hilda Alington  (née Broadhead, 30 September 1920 – 15 October 2012) was a New Zealand librarian, historian and author.

Life and career
Alington was born and educated in Christchurch, New Zealand. She graduated from Canterbury University College with a Bachelor of Arts in 1943. She worked as a librarian in the Canterbury and Auckland University College libraries, Leeds University Library, University of Illinois library (Urbana, US), and the Alexander Turnbull Library (part of the National Library of New Zealand).

Much of Alington's research centred on the life and work of the Revd Frederick Thatcher, architect of New Zealand buildings including St Mary's Church (New Plymouth), and Old St Paul's (Wellington). The culmination of this investigation was Alington's book, An Excellent recruit: Frederick Thatcher, architect, priest and private secretary in early New Zealand, published in 2007. Alington gave an annual lecture on the history of Old St Paul's at the School of Architecture at Victoria University of Wellington from 1978 to 2005.

In 1977, Alington was largely responsible for the formation of The Friends of Bolton Street Cemetery, now Bolton Street Memorial Park, which restored the grounds, buildings and the many grave-sites of well known historical people. She also wrote a detailed history of the cemetery called Unquiet Earth. Alington guided visitors around the cemetery for many years and gave many talks on it. She also wrote a history of the church (St Mary's Church), called Goodly Stones and Timbers, in 1988.

In the 1999 New Year Honours, Alington was appointed an Officer of the New Zealand Order of Merit, for services to local history. She was a contributor to the Dictionary of New Zealand Biography.

She was the wife of New Zealand architect Bill Alington. Their former home, now called Alington House, has been classified as Category I by Heritage New Zealand. It is "an important New Zealand example of Modern Movement architecture."

She died at her home in Wellington, New Zealand on 15 October 2012.

Books
 Frederick Thatcher and Old St Paul's (1965)
 
 
 Good Stones and Timbers: A History of St Mary's Church, New Plymouth (1988)
 High Point: St Mary's Church, Karori, Wellington 1866–1991 (1998)
 An Excellent Recruit: Frederick Thatcher, Architect, Priest And Private Secretary In Early New Zealand, with architectural assistance from William H. Alington (2007)

References

External links 
 THATCHER, Frederick – Te Ara: The Encyclopedia of New Zealand
 Thatcher, Frederick – Biography – Te Ara: The Encyclopedia of New Zealand
 Alington, Margaret H. (Margaret Hilda) (1920–) – People and organisations – Trove
 Margaret H. Alington | NZETC

1920 births
2012 deaths
20th-century New Zealand historians
New Zealand librarians
Women librarians
New Zealand women writers
Writers from Christchurch
Officers of the New Zealand Order of Merit
University of Canterbury alumni
New Zealand women historians
New Zealand expatriates in the United States
New Zealand expatriates in England
21st-century New Zealand historians